The Schwurhand ("swear-hand") is a heraldic charge depicting the hand gesture that is used in Germanic Europe and neighboring countries, when swearing an oath in court, in office or in swearing-in. The right hand is raised, with the index finger and middle finger extended upwards; the last two digits are curled downwards against the palm. The thumb is shown slightly curled or raised.

Traditional use

The use of the gesture dates back many centuries. Recruits of the Pontifical Swiss Guard at the Vatican City use the sign when swearing their oath of allegiance to the Pope, in a ceremony performed on 6 May every year since the Sack of Rome in 1527. The use of the three digits is said to symbolise the Holy Trinity.

In Switzerland 

Depictions of the Rütli Oath or Rütlischwur, the legendary founding oath of the Old Swiss Confederacy in the 13th century, show the participants using this gesture. The people elected at the Swiss Federal Assembly and at the Swiss Federal Council traditionally use the Schwurhand for their oath of office (and say 'I swear').

Heraldic use

Military use

See also
 Benediction
 Hand gestures (Oath) 
 Three-finger salute (Serbian)

References

Hand gestures
Swiss culture
Oaths of allegiance
Heraldic charges
Salutes
Gestures of respect